Shrimal (Srimal) Jain  is an ancient Jain and Hindu community originally from Rajasthan, Shrimal or Bhinmal town in southern Rajasthan. They were traditionally wealthy merchants and money lenders and were prominent at the court of Rajput kings as treasurers and ministers, holding the titles of Dewan or Durbari. This caste is claimed to descend from the Goddess Lakshmi and their descendants are well known for business acumen and are in possession of Havelis and mansions given to them as gifts from kings for their service as royal treasurers, ministers, courtiers and advisors. The Shrimal (Srimal) Jain are thought to be the highest gotra in the Oswal merchant and minister caste that is found primarily in the north of India.

It is believed that the Srimal formed their own caste separate from the Oswal, evidenced by the fact that the majority of Srimals are Jain, which is also the case with the Oswal caste who descend from the Raja of Osnagar, a Rajput prince who converted to Jainism upon witnessing Sri Ratan Suri, a Jain ascetic, bring his son back to life. A few Srimals are Hindu and follow the Vaishnav path while worshipping their kuladevi, Goddess Laxmi. They mainly reside in Rajasthan, Madhya Pradesh and Gujarat.

Parasnath Temple
The Court Jewelers to the Viceroy and Governor General of British India built  Calcutta Jain Temple, Parasnath Temple, in 1867. It is built in Belgian glass. It is also known as Mookim's temple garden.

Prominent Shrimals
 Rai Badridas Bahadoor Mukeem was son of Kalkadas Mukeem. He migrated from Lucknow to Kolkata. He built Jain temples in Sammet Shikhar and Purimatal (Allahabad).
 Thakkar Pheru of Delhi, author of 14th century texts on precious metals and gems and courtier to Alauddin Khalji and later Ghiyath al-Din Tughluq .
 Poet Banarasidas of Agra 
 Jain scholar Kanji Swami
Bhamashah a financier, general and minister in the court of the great Rana Pratap of Mewar. 
 Bharmal Shah, qiledar of Ranthambore fort appointed by Rana Sanga and was later prime minister under Maharana Udai Singh.
 Rai Bahadur Badri Das, the builder of the famous Calcutta Jain Temple dedicated to Lord Shitalnath in 1867.
 Sarabhai family of Ahmedabad

See also
Porwal
Oswal
Thakkar Pheru

References

External links 
 Gateway to Indian Classical Literature By Various, Poornima Pillai,Published 2005 Asiapac Books Pte Ltd, p. 138-139, 
 Thacker's Guide to Calcutta By Walter Kelly Firminger, Published 1906, Thacker, Spink & Co. p. 65
 Vane Russell, Robert (1916). "Tribes and castes of the central provinces of India", p. 111-161. 'Forgotten books. .

Indian surnames
Social groups of Rajasthan
Jain communities